Osowa Góra, a district in the western part of Bydgoszcz, at the northern part of Bydgoszcz Canal. It has about 14,000 residents. It was incorporated into Bydgoszcz in 1959.

Buildings & Places

 Saint Maximilian Kolbe Church
 Ascension of Jesus Church
 Pool "Sardynka" (Sardine)
 Animal Shelter

Education 

Primary Schools
 Marian Rejewski 40th Primary School
 650th Bydgoszcz's Birthday 64th Primary School

See also 

 Bydgoszcz

References

External links 
 (pl) www.OsowaOnline.pl

Bydgoszcz
Neighbourhoods in Bydgoszcz